The Great Session is an album led by pianist Duke Jordan recorded in 1978 and released on the Danish SteepleChase label in 1981.

Reception

AllMusic awarded the album 3½ stars stating "There's a bit of hyperbole in the album's title, as the play list is hardly adventurous and the arrangements are average, in spite of the strong personnel".

Track listing
 "All the Things You Are" (Oscar Hammerstein II, Jerome Kern) - 6:36
 "Moonglow" (Eddie DeLange, Will Hudson, Irving Mills) - 7:28
 "Satin Doll" (Duke Ellington, Billy Strayhorn, Johnny Mercer) - 6:38
 "Thinking of You" (Duke Jordan) - 8:55 Bonus track on CD release 		
 "A Night in Tunisia" (Dizzy Gillespie, Frank Paparelli) - 9:53
 "Lady Bird" (Tadd Dameron) - 6:57
 "Blues in the Closet" (Oscar Pettiford) - 4:11

Personnel
Duke Jordan - piano 
David Friesen - bass 
Philly Joe Jones - drums

References

1981 albums
Duke Jordan albums
SteepleChase Records albums